The 2019 FIL European Luge Championships took place under the auspices of the International Luge Federation at the Oberhof bobsleigh, luge, and skeleton track in Oberhof, Germany from 9 to 10 February 2019.

Schedule
Four events were held.

Medal summary

Medal table

Medalists

References

External links
FIL website

 
2019
FIL European Luge Championships
FIL European Luge Championships
International luge competitions hosted by Germany
Sports competitions in Thuringia
FIL European Luge Championships
Sport in Oberhof, Germany
2010s in Thuringia
Luge